Qarah Borqa (also Romanized as Qarah Borqa‘; also known as Qarā Borqa‘) is a village in Sarajuy-ye Gharbi Rural District, in the Central District of Maragheh County, East Azerbaijan Province, Iran. At the 2006 census, its population was 823, in 206 families.

References 

Towns and villages in Maragheh County